Nishi Vasudeva (born 30 March 1956) is an Indian business executive. She is a former Chairman and Managing Director (CMD) [from 1 March 2014 to 31 March 2016] of Hindustan Petroleum Corporation Limited (HPCL), an Indian state-owned oil & gas corporation and India's fourth largest company by revenue. She is the first woman ever to head a Navratna PSU.

Background
Vasudeva is a 1977 batch MBA graduate of Indian Institute of Management Calcutta.

Career
Nishi Vasudeva has started her career in the petroleum industry with Engineers India Ltd.

She has been in corporate roles from last 15 years 
1994-2000 : DGM (ERP) at Head office 
2000-2002 : GM (Corporate Planning) at Head office 
2002-2010 : GM and ED (IT) at Head office 
2011 - 2012 : Executive Director (LPG)
2012-2014 : Dir(` Marketing) at Head office 
2014-16 : CMD

Before taking over as the CMD, Vasudeva served as the Director of Marketing and Executive Director-Marketing Coordination. She has more than 34 years of experience in petroleum industry.

References

External links
 Aavantika Gas Limited
 HPCL

Indian Institute of Management Calcutta alumni
Living people
1956 births
Indian women business executives
Indian business executives